Bairin may refer to:

Bairin Left Banner, subdivision of Inner Mongolia, China
Bairin Right Banner, subdivision of Inner Mongolia, China
Bairin Park, in Gifu, Gifu Prefecture, Japan

See also
Bairin Station, in Yagi, Hiroshima Prefecture, Japan